Amboy is an unincorporated community in Turner County, in the U.S. state of Georgia. GNIS spells the name "Armboy".

History
A post office called Amboy was established in 1899, and remained in operation until 1950. The community's name is a transfer from Amboy, New Jersey.

References

Unincorporated communities in Turner County, Georgia